Low-pressure discharges exist within Gas-discharge lamps. The electric discharges in gases are made under gas pressures from a few millitorr to a little less than atmospheric.

Description

They are most often used in industry to generate plasma. Less power is required to sustain the discharge at lower pressures as volume-recombination rates are lower. It is also easier to achieve uniform discharges at low pressure. 

Normally, the system is pumped down and only necessary plasma gases are then flown into the plasma chamber. Argon is a typical background gas because it has low ionization potential and therefore is easier to break down and sustain.

Most discharges used in the semiconductor industry employ low-pressure plasmas.

See also

References

Gas discharge lamps